Nanzhao  is a town Zhao'an County, in southern Fujian province, China.

See also
List of township-level divisions of Fujian

References

Township-level divisions of Fujian
Zhao'an County